Stay on Board: The Leo Baker Story is a 2022 American Netflix original biographical documentary film directed by Nicola Marsh and Giovanni Reda. Its story follows American skateboarder Leo Baker and details his journey and struggles during his career due to being a trans man.

The film premiered at the 2022 Outfest Los Angeles LGBTQ+ Film Festival on 21th July 2022 where it won the audience award for documentary feature. It was released by Netflix on August 11, 2022.

References

External links 

2022 films
2022 documentary films
American sports documentary films
2020s English-language films
Films about trans men
Documentary films about sexuality
Documentary films about gay men
Films about sexuality
2022 LGBT-related films
Skateboarding films
Transgender-related documentary films
2020s American films
Netflix original documentary films
American LGBT-related films
Films scored by Alex Somers
Documentary films about LGBT sportspeople